Tuukka Pulliainen (born 25 August 1984) is a Finnish former professional ice hockey forward who played for TPS and HPK in the Liiga. He also had periods abroad in Slovakia and Germany. Pulliainen ended his active career in 2017 after five consecutive seasons with Finnish second-tier team TuTo. He was drafted 248th overall in the 2002 NHL Entry Draft by the Los Angeles Kings.

Career statistics

Regular season and playoffs

International

References

1984 births
Finnish ice hockey centres
HC '05 Banská Bystrica players
HC TPS players
HPK players
Jokipojat players
Lausitzer Füchse players
Living people
Los Angeles Kings draft picks
TuTo players
Sportspeople from Turku
Finnish expatriate ice hockey players in Slovakia
Finnish expatriate ice hockey players in Germany